"The Power" is a song by German Eurodance group Snap! as their debut single. It was released on 3 January 1990 as the lead single from their debut studio album, World Power (1990). The song reached number one in Greece, the Netherlands, Spain, Switzerland, the UK and Zimbabwe, as well as on the US Billboard Hot Dance Club Play and Hot Rap charts. On the Billboard Hot 100, "The Power" managed to reach number two for one week.

Background
Written and produced by Michael Münzing and Luca Anzilotti (under the pseudonyms Benito Benites and John "Virgo" Garrett III), "The Power" went through several renditions. The original version was released on 3 January 1990 through Logic Records in Germany and contains samples from "Let the Words Flow" by Chill Rob G, "Love's Gonna Get You" by Jocelyn Brown, and "King of the Beats" by Mantronix. Despite it becoming an early 1990 hit in Germany and appearing on the Dance Singles chart in the UK, none of the credited vocals were cleared, and Stu Fine, former owner of Wild Pitch Records, wanted to release the song in the United States. Rob G, who was signed to Wild Pitch, consented, initially thinking the deal could be lucrative for his career. Wild Pitch issued a stateside single and video with his lyrics from "Let the Words Flow" on 5 March 1990. However, this version was credited under Power Jam and not Snap!.

Simultaneously, Arista Records wished to release their own edition in the US, but because it was not legally possible for the label to simply reissue the original German single, it was decided to re-record the entire track with new lyrics by rapper Durron Butler, known as Turbo B, and additional vocals by Penny Ford. The samples were then all legally cleared and the song was finally re-released under the new name Snap! on 12 March 1990 in the UK and 6 April 1990 in the US, despite the fact that Jocelyn Brown had commenced legal action because of the unauthorized sampling of her vocals.

This song is written in the key of B minor, and opens with the spoken Russian "Американская фирма Transceptor Technology приступила к производству компьютеров „Персональный спутник" (meaning "The American company Transceptor Technology has started production of the 'Personal Companion' computer"). "Personal Companion" was a computer-like device for the blind and visually impaired. Released in 1990, it was controlled by voice and could, among other functions, automatically download articles from USA Today by a built-in modem. It was made by Transceptor Technologies of Ann Arbor, Michigan.

Critical reception
Bill Coleman from Billboard wrote that "thanks to a healthy buzz generated via underground import attention, this hypnotic, street-soul jam should have no trouble duplicating its smash U.K. success. Expect big crossover action." Ernest Hardy from Cash Box said the song is "set against a basic hip-hop beat, but all sorts of computer-generated enhancements are added, as well as a great bassline, soul-drenched female vocals, a male rap that sounds a bit like Heavy D, and, depending on the mix, elements of house. Yet none of it seems forced or contrived, and it doesn't sound quite like anything else that's out there right now. This one will be huge." Complex magazine described it as "a more industrial take on the hip-house scene that blew up" at that time the song was released.

Tom Ewing of Freaky Trigger noted that the song "juggles aggression and melancholy, and makes both immediately appealing – the juddering riff which opens "The Power" set against the slow pace and lonesome spaciousness of the production and Pennye Ford's vocals. The riff is more distinctive than the singing, to be honest, but the contrast works." Pan-European magazine Music & Media commented that a "funky hip-hop rhythm, sampled from Doug Lazy's Let It Roll has been matched with some forceful rapping by Turbo B and inspired gospel vocals on the chorus. Excellent warm production by Benito Benites, John Garrett III and Snap. Could be the next big thing from the Continent." A reviewer from The Network Forty described it as "a very hip and cool" rap song, "with a modern edge". The magazine also added that the "power charged rap-dance" does "crackles and pops with enough irresistible energy".

Chart performance
"The Power" proved to be very successful on the charts worldwide. It peaked at number-one on both the RPM Dance/Urban chart in Canada and the Billboard Hot Dance Club Play chart in the US. In Europe, the single peaked at number-one in Greece, the Netherlands, Spain, Switzerland and the UK, as well as on the Eurochart Hot 100. In the UK, it hit the top spot in its second week at the UK Singles Chart, on March 25, 1990. It spent two weeks at the top of the chart. Additionally, "The Power" made it into the top 10 also in Austria, Belgium, Finland, West Germany, Ireland, Italy, Norway, Portugal and Sweden. Outside Europe, it peaked at number-one in Zimbabwe, number two on both the Billboard Hot 100 and the Cash Box Top 100 in the US, number six in New Zealand and number thirteen in Australia. The single earned a gold record in Australia, Germany, the Netherlands, Sweden and Switzerland, and a silver record in the UK. In Spain and the US, it was awarded with a platinum record.

Impact and legacy
In 2010, Pitchfork included the song in their list of "Ten Actually Good 90s Jock Jams".

In 2017, BuzzFeed ranked "The Power" number 38 in their list of "The 101 Greatest Dance Songs of the '90s". 

In 2019, Billboard placed it at number 179 in their list of "Billboards Top Songs of the '90s".

In July 2020, digital publication The Pudding carried out a study on the most iconic songs from the '90s and songs that are most known by Millennials and the people of Generation Z. "The Power" was the seventh song with the highest recognisability rate.

In 2022, Rolling Stone ranked it number 188 in their list of "200 Greatest Dance Songs of All Time".

Track listings

1990 version
12" maxi
"The Power" (ful mix) (6:00)
"The Power" (switch mix) (6:21)
"The Power" (potential mix) (5:42)

7" single
"The Power" (3:47)
"The Power" (dub) (5:35)

CD version
"The Power" (ful mix) (6:00)
"The Power" (jungle fever mix) (7:23)
"The Power" (potential mix) (5:42)
"The Power" (7" version) (3:44)

1996 version
CD version
"The Power '96" (silk 7") (3:53)
"The Power '96" (E=mc2 12") (6:44)
"The Power '96" (original dub 12") (4:57)
"Ex-Terminator" (from the class 'X) (5:21)

Charts and certifications

Weekly charts

Year-end charts

Certifications

Covers, samples and remixes
The song was covered in 2002 by H-Blockx. Turbo B featured in the song taking turns to rap lyrics with H-Blockx's then frontman Dave Gappa. Of note, Turbo B replaces the word 'Snap!' with 'H-blockx' in the line "If they are Snap! don't need the police to try to save them". The single charted at number 48 in Germany, number 51 in Austria and number 34 in Australia. In Australia, this version was used to promote the Seven Network's coverage of the 2002 Commonwealth Games.

See also
List of Billboard number-one rap singles of the 1980s and 1990s
List of Dutch Top 40 number-one singles of 1990
List of European number-one hits of 1990
List of number-one singles of 1990 (Spain)
List of number-one singles of the 1990s (Switzerland)
List of number-one dance singles of 1990 (U.S.)
List of RPM number-one dance singles of 1990
List of UK Singles Chart number ones of the 1990s
Techno Mart tremors caused by resonant frequency matching "The Power"

References

1990 debut singles
1990 songs
Dutch Top 40 number-one singles
European Hot 100 Singles number-one singles
Number-one singles in Greece
Number-one singles in Spain
Number-one singles in Switzerland
Number-one singles in Zimbabwe
Snap! songs
UK Singles Chart number-one singles